Kanhe Station is a railway station of Pune Suburban Railway on Mumbai–Chennai line.

Local trains between Pune Junction–, –Lonavala stop here.

The only passenger train having stop on this station is the Pune Junction– Passenger.

The station has two platforms and a foot overbridge. There is a small market nearby the railway station for groceries, fast foods and household items.

A roadway to industrial areas beside the railway station crossing.

References

Pune Suburban Railway
Pune railway division
Railway stations in Pune district